Chindia Târgoviște may refer to:

 FCM Târgoviște, a Romanian football club founded in 1948 that was named Chindia Târgoviște between 1996 and 2003
 AFC Chindia Târgoviște, a Romanian football club founded in 2010
 Chindia Tower, a tower in Târgoviște, Romania